Ləzran or Lezran or Lyazan or Lyazran may refer to:
 Ləzran, Jalilabad, Azerbaijan
 Ləzran, Yardymli, Azerbaijan